Max Asher may refer to:

Max Asher (actor), actor during the silent film era
 Max Asher (drummer), former drummer of the American glam metal band
 Max Asher, one of the title characters in the television show Max & Shred
 Max Asher, a main character in the television show MythQuest